Comandanta Ramona (1959 – January 6, 2006) was an officer of the Zapatista Army of National Liberation (EZLN), a revolutionary indigenous autonomist organization based in the southern Mexican state of Chiapas.

Biography
Ramona was born in 1959 in a Tzotzil Maya community in the highlands of Chiapas, Mexico. Ramona used to sell handmade goods to make a poor living before she joined the EZLN. It is unknown when she joined the EZLN and what her life was like prior to the revolution.

Ramona took control of the city of San Cristóbal de las Casas, the former capital of Chiapas, during the January 1, 1994, Zapatista uprising. Ramona began a long fight with cancer the same year. In 1995, she received a kidney transplant.

In 1996, she broke through a government encirclement when she traveled to Mexico City to help found the National Indigenous Congress. She was also the first Zapatista rebel to be granted government permission to travel outside of Chiapas for a three days conference where she delivered her first peace talk.

Legacy

Ramona was famous for being masked and clothed in traditional Indigenous dresses. Vendors in her hometown have created ‘doll’ replicas of Ramona in her honor.

See also
Subcomandante Elisa

References

Indigenous Mexicans
Mexican feminists
1959 births
Members of the Zapatista Army of National Liberation
2006 deaths
Deaths from kidney failure
21st-century deaths from tuberculosis
Mexican people of Maya descent
People from Chiapas
Tuberculosis deaths in Mexico
Women in war in Mexico
Women in warfare post-1945
Kidney transplant recipients
Female revolutionaries